Incaeromene is a monotypic moth genus of the family Crambidae described by David E. Gaskin in 1986. Its only species, Incaeromene subuncusella, described in the same article, is found in Peru.

The wingspan is about 15 mm. The ground colour of the forewings is silvery white. The hindwings are pure silvery white.

Etymology
The genus name is derived from Inca (pertaining to the Incas) and Greek eromene (meaning mistress).

References

Diptychophorini
Crambidae genera
Monotypic moth genera